ZJA (previously known as Zwarts & Jansma Architecten) is a Dutch architectural studio located in Amsterdam and founded in 1990 by Rein Jansma and Moshé Zwarts (1937-2019). To date, the studio has approximately 50 staff and the partners are Rein Jansma, Ralph Kieft, Reinald Top and Rob Torsing.

History 
The architectural studio Zwarts & Jansma Architecten was founded in 1990 as partnership between Rein Jansma and the late Moshé Zwarts, former professor of architectural technology. In 1971 Zwarts met Jansma, the son of his friend and neighbor Arie Jansma, an activist, inventor and artist. During the 80s, several years before registering their ‘office for architecture and development’ (buro voor architectuur en ontwikkeling), architecture student Jansma and professor Zwarts (professor of building technology at TU Eindhoven and TU Delft) collaborated and developed projects and experiments in the workshop next to Zwarts' home in Abcoude. As their collaboration became more serious, they formalised their partnership in 1990 with the architectural studio known today as ZJA. One of their first design assignments was for a bus or tramway shelter for the city of The Hague. Their design was awarded the Berlage Award and the city of The Hague ordered 800 shelters.

ZJA subsequently took on a wide variety of projects. They were commissioned to design the Dutch Pavilion at the World Expo 1992 in Sevilla. ZJA also designed the upper ring and the roof of Feijenoord Football Stadium, De Kuip in Rotterdam (1993) and the new glasshouse for the Hortus Botanicus in Amsterdam (1992).

In the following years ZJA specialised in infrastructure projects, such as (bicycle) bridges, metro and train stations and traffic interchanges. However, sports halls, (football) stadiums, entertainment centres and wildlife crossings also feature prominently in their portfolio.

Design approach 
ZJA is known for attention to areas where architectural design touches upon questions of engineering, construction technology and materials. The architectural studio has its own research and development department, which produces results that in some cases lead to patents. An example of the latter, is the new building typology known as The Shaded Dome, an extremely flexible and mobile construction that combines an air-inflated dome with a tent that rests on a network of steel cables.

ZJA designs are characteristically simple, light and slender structures. The designs follow flowing lines, the colours are mostly light, the shapes resemble a stylised version of organic forms,  in correspondence with the program and the direct environment. According to ZJA itself, they are always looking to minimise the use of energy and material while trying to hinder as little as possible the open views and the free movement of people.

Selected projects and awards

Publications 
 Zwarts & Jansma Architects. By J. Mensink. Amsterdam: Architecture & Natura, 2003. 
 100 jaar Modern Den Haag. By E. Vreedenburg & Marcel Teunissen, with contributions by Mick Eekhout. Rotterdam: NAi Publishers, 2020. 
 Het Stadion de architectuur van massasport. By M. Bouw (and includes interview with ZJA). Rotterdam: NAI Publishers, 2000. 
 Architecture Now. Amsterdam: Architectura & Natura, 1991.

Gallery

References 

1990 establishments in the Netherlands
Architecture firms of the Netherlands
Companies based in Amsterdam